The 1991/92 FIS Freestyle Skiing World Cup was the thirteenth World Cup season in freestyle skiing organised by International Ski Federation. The season started on 2 December 1991 and ended on 14 March 1992. This season included four disciplines: aerials, moguls, ballet and combined. 

Competitors of Soviet Union were competing under this flag until 25 December 1991 when this country fall apart. Since then they competed for the Commonwealth of Independent States.

Men

Moguls

Aerials

Ballet

Combined

Ladies

Aerials

Moguls

Ballet

Combined

Men's standings

Overall 

Standings after 44 races.

Moguls 

Standings after 11 races.

Aerials 

Standings after 11 races.

Ballet 

Standings after 11 races.

Combined 

Standings after 11 races.

Ladies' standings

Overall 

Standings after 45 races.

Moguls 

Standings after 11 races.

Aerials 

Standings after 12 races.

Ballet 

Standings after 11 races.

Combined 

Standings after 11 races.

References

FIS Freestyle Skiing World Cup
World Cup
World Cup